UFC 245: Usman vs. Covington was a mixed martial arts event produced by the Ultimate Fighting Championship that took place on December 14, 2019 at T-Mobile Arena in Paradise, Nevada, part of the Las Vegas Metropolitan Area, United States.

Background
A UFC Welterweight Championship bout between the current champion and The Ultimate Fighter: American Top Team vs. Blackzilians winner Kamaru Usman and former interim champion Colby Covington served as the event headliner.

A UFC Featherweight Championship bout between the current champion Max Holloway and Alexander Volkanovski took place as the co-main event.

A UFC Women's Bantamweight Championship bout between the current champion Amanda Nunes (also the current UFC Women's Featherweight Champion) and the inaugural featherweight champion Germaine de Randamie also took place at the event. The pairing previously met in November 2013 at UFC: Fight for the Troops 3, with Nunes winning the encounter via TKO in the first round.

Santiago Ponzinibbio was expected to face former welterweight champion Robbie Lawler at the event. However, Ponzinibbio pulled out of the fight on October 12 citing a staph infection. Despite having over two months before the event, promotion officials elected to remove Lawler from the card entirely instead of having him face a replacement.

Sergio Pettis was briefly linked to a bout with Kai Kara-France at the event. However, Pettis revealed in early October that he was entertaining offers from other promotions after the completion of his previous contract and did not currently have a fight lined up with the promotion. Kara-France ultimately faced Brandon Moreno. 

At the weigh-ins, former UFC Women's Flyweight Championship challenger Jessica Eye failed to make weight, coming in at 131 pounds, five pounds over the flyweight non-title fight limit of 126 pounds. She was fined 30% of her fight purse, which went to her opponent Viviane Araújo and the bout proceeded at a catchweight.

Results

Bonus awards
The following fighters received $50,000 bonuses.
Fight of the Night: Kamaru Usman vs. Colby Covington
Performance of the Night: Petr Yan and Irene Aldana

Reported payout
The following is the reported payout to the fighters as reported to the Nevada State Athletic Commission. It does not include sponsor money and also does not include the UFC's traditional "fight night" bonuses. The total disclosed payout for the event was $4,084,000.
 Kamaru Usman: $500,000 (no win bonus) def. Colby Covington: $500,000
 Alexander Volkanovski: $250,000 (no win bonus) def. Max Holloway: $350,000
 Amanda Nunes: $450,000 (includes $100,000 win bonus) def. Germaine de Randamie: $100,000
 Marlon Moraes: $220,000 (includes $110,000 win bonus) def. José Aldo: $400,000
 Petr Yan: $132,000 (includes $66,000 win bonus) def. Urijah Faber: $250,000
 Geoff Neal: $62,000 (includes $31,000 win bonus) def. Mike Perry: $90,000 
 Irene Aldana: $80,000 (includes $40,000 win bonus) def. Ketlen Vieira: $33,000
 Omari Akhmedov: $110,000 (includes $55,000 win bonus) def. Ian Heinisch: $25,000 
 Matt Brown: $160,000 (includes $80,000 win bonus) def. Ben Saunders: $35,000
 Chase Hooper: $48,000 (includes $24,000 win bonus) def. Daniel Teymur: $18,000
 Brandon Moreno: $62,000 (includes $31,000 win bonus) def. Kai Kara-France: $25,000
 Jessica Eye: $96,000 (includes $48,000 win bonus) def. Viviane Araújo: $45,000
 Puna Soriano: $20,000 (includes $10,000 win bonus) def. Oskar Piechota: $20,000

See also 

 List of UFC events
 2019 in UFC
 List of current UFC fighters

References 

Ultimate Fighting Championship events
2019 in mixed martial arts
Mixed martial arts in Las Vegas
Events in Paradise, Nevada